Suru River may refer to:

 Suru River (Indus), a tributary of the Indus River in India
 Suru, a tributary of the river Boia Mică in Romania